Tristan Thomas (born 23 May 1986 in Brisbane) is an Australian track and field athlete specialising in the 400 metres hurdles.

Currently coached by Craig Hilliard at the Australian Institute of Sport in Canberra, Thomas has set personal bests over a diverse range of distances and has been nationally ranked over 200 metres, 400 metres, 800 metres and 400m Hurdles in various athletics season in Australia. Thomas is a four time National Champion of the 400 metres hurdles. He is the second best Australian of all time in this event and he is the Tasmanian record holder. Thomas had displayed his ability whilst in school, winning an unprecedented four gold medals in the above events at the 2004 Australian All Schools Championships. He was selected to compete in the 2012 Summer Olympics in London in the 400 metres hurdles. He finished 4th in heat four with a time of 49.13. This qualified him for the semifinals. He finished 7th in semifinal two with a time of 50.55. This did not qualify him for the next stage and this was the end of Thomas's competition. He has also competed in three World Championships (2009, 2011 and 2013). He won bronze in 2009 in the 4 x 400 metres relay. He now currently teaches at Radford College Canberra as a maths teacher. Thomas competed in the 2006 Commonwealth Games but missed the 2010 competition due to injury. He was selected for the 2014 games but withdrew due to injury.

Education
For primary school Tristan Thomas attended Corpus Christi in Hobart, Tasmania. For high school Thomas attended St Virgils also in Hobart. Thomas achieved a Bachelor of Engineering and Commerce at the Australian National University.

Personal bests

Progression

International competitions

References

External links
 Tristan Thomas at Australian Institute of Sport
 

1986 births
Living people
Australian male hurdlers
Australian male sprinters
Athletes from Brisbane
Athletes (track and field) at the 2012 Summer Olympics
Olympic athletes of Australia
World Athletics Championships athletes for Australia
Commonwealth Games competitors for Australia
Athletes (track and field) at the 2006 Commonwealth Games
Australian Institute of Sport track and field athletes
Universiade medalists in athletics (track and field)
Universiade gold medalists for Australia
Universiade bronze medalists for Australia
Medalists at the 2009 Summer Universiade
Medalists at the 2007 Summer Universiade